Petersdorf station was a railway station in the Petersdorf part of the municipality of Dorf Mecklenburg, located in the Nordwestmecklenburg district in Mecklenburg-Vorpommern, Germany.

History
The Petersdorf stop was abandoned for the timetable change in December 2012, as extensive expansion measures would have been necessary for continued operation.

References

Railway stations in Mecklenburg-Western Pomerania
Buildings and structures in Nordwestmecklenburg
Railway stations closed in 2012
2012 disestablishments in Germany